Looking Ahead is the fifth studio album by American country pop artist Billy Joe Royal, released in 1987.

Three singles from this album charted on the Country Singles chart.  The first was Burned Like a Rocket, which peaked at #10.  This was followed by I Miss You Already (#14) and Old Bridges Burn Slow (#11).

The album also landed on the Country Albums chart, reaching #23.

Track listing

Chart performance

1987 albums
Billy Joe Royal albums
Atlantic Records albums